The Eurovision Song Contest 1978 was the 23rd edition of the annual Eurovision Song Contest. Organised by the European Broadcasting Union (EBU) and host broadcaster Télévision Française 1 (TF1), the contest was held at the Palais des Congrès on 22 April 1978 and was hosted by French television presenters Denise Fabre and Léon Zitrone. This was the first time that more than one presenter had hosted the contest as well as the first to have a male presenter since . In addition to hosting, the two presenters also served as commentators for France.

Twenty countries participated, the highest number of competing countries in the history of the competition at the time.  and  both returned to the contest. Denmark had not participated since , 12 years before.

Although 'A-Ba-Ni-Bi' is the correct title, French television mistakenly captioned on screen the song title as 'Ah-Bah-Nee-Bee'. The winning entry was a love song sung in the Hebrew equivalent of Ubbi dubbi (the title is an expansion of the Hebrew word ani אני, meaning "I"). This was 's first Eurovision win, and it was also the first winning song to be performed in one of the Semitic languages.

Location 

The event took place in Paris, the capital and largest city of France, with the host venue being the Palais des Congrès de Paris which is a concert venue, convention centre and shopping mall in the 17th arrondissement of Paris. The venue was built by French architect Guillaume Gillet, and was inaugurated in 1974.

Format 
The postcards were filmed live, featuring the artists making their way to the stage. They took a corridor, then an elevator. Leaving the lift, they were greeted by the previous participants and then made their entrances to the stage. The camera also made several shots of the audience, notably Jane Birkin and Serge Gainsbourg.

The Swedish participant Björn Skifs was unhappy with the rule that every country would have to perform in their native language. He planned to sing in English anyway, but changed his mind at the last moment, causing him to completely forget the lyrics. He therefore sang the first few lines in gibberish before finding the words again.  Along with the 20 participating countries, the show was also broadcast live in Yugoslavia, Tunisia, Algeria, Morocco, Jordan, East Germany, Poland, Hungary, Czechoslovakia, Dubai, Hong Kong, the Soviet Union and Japan.

Participating countries 
Denmark returned to the competition after having been absent for twelve years, while Turkey did so after missing out two years. This meant that, for the first time, the contest had twenty participating nations competing.

Conductors 
Each performance had a conductor who directed the orchestra.

 Noel Kelehan
 Carsten Klouman
 Nicola Samale
 Ossi Runne
 
 Alain Goraguer
 
 Alyn Ainsworth
 
 
 Harry van Hoof
 Onno Tunç
 
 Yvon Rioland
 Haris Andreadis
 Helmer Olesen
 Rolf Soja
 Nurit Hirsh
 Richard Oesterreicher

Returning artists

Participants and results

Detailed voting results

12 points 
Below is a summary of all 12 points in the final:

Spokespersons 

Listed below is the order in which votes were cast during the 1978 contest along with the spokesperson who was responsible for announcing the votes for their respective country.

 John Skehan
 
 
 Kaarina Pönniö
 
 Marc Menant
 Matías Prats Luque
 Colin Berry
 Michel Stocker
 André Hagon
 Dick van Bommel
 Meral Savcı
 
 Carole Chabrier
 Niki Venega
 Jens Dreyer
 Jacques Harvey
 
 
 Sven Lindahl

Broadcasts 

Each participating broadcaster was required to relay the contest via its networks. Non-participating EBU member broadcasters were also able to relay the contest as "passive participants". Broadcasters were able to send commentators to provide coverage of the contest in their own native language and to relay information about the artists and songs to their television viewers.

Known details on the broadcasts in each country, including the specific broadcasting stations and commentators are shown in the tables below. In addition to the participating countries, the contest was also reportedly broadcast in Algeria, Iceland, Jordan, Morocco, Tunisia and Yugoslavia, in Czechoslovakia, East Germany, Hungary, Poland and the Soviet Union via Intervision, and in Hong Kong, Japan and the United Arab Emirates.

Incidents

Israeli victory reactions
The Israeli win caused problems for several North African and Middle-Eastern nations that were televising the contest, even though they were not participating. According to author and political commentator John Kennedy O'Connor in his book The Eurovision Song Contest: The Official History, when Israel became the clear winners during the voting, most of the Arabic stations ended their transmission of the contest. Jordanian TV finished the show with a photo of a bunch of daffodils on screen, later announcing that the Belgian entry (which finished second) was the winner.

See also 
 OTI Festival 1978

Notes

References

External links

 

 
1978
Music festivals in France
1978 in French television
1978 in Israel
1978 in Paris
1978 music festivals
April 1978 events in Europe
Events in Paris